Savannah Drive is an acoustic album by Maria Taylor and Andy LeMaster, who previously both had been collaborating multiple times on Bright Eyes records. The album was released on June 17, 2008 on Nettwerk Records.

Track listing
"Song Beneath the Song" - 3:24
"Birmingham 1982" - 3:31
"LadyLuck" - 3:40
"A Good Start" - 4:34
"Leap Year" - 4:31
"Time Lapse Lifeline - 4:18
"Tell Me" - 3:37

Trivia
All songs but one have been featured on other Maria Taylor albums:
 "Song Beneath the Song", "Birmingham 1982" and "Leap Year" were featured on Taylor's first solo album, 11:11.
 "A Good Start" was also featured on Taylor's previous record, Lynn Teeter Flower.
 "LadyLuck" and "Time Lapse Lifeline" are featured on Taylor's 2009 album, LadyLuck.

References

Maria Taylor albums
Nettwerk Records EPs
2008 EPs